Luis Emanuel Nițu (born 30 May 2001) is a Romanian professional footballer who plays as a forward for CSM Slatina.

Career Statistics

Club

References

External links
 
 
 

2001 births
Living people
Sportspeople from Slatina, Romania
Romanian footballers
Romania youth international footballers
Association football forwards
Liga I players
Liga II players
CS Universitatea Craiova players
CS Gaz Metan Mediaș players
CSM Slatina footballers